Cowra is a small town in the Central West region of New South Wales, Australia. It is the largest population centre and the council seat for the Cowra Shire, with a population of 9,863.

The town is situated at the intersection of three state highways: the Mid-Western Highway, Olympic Highway, and the Lachlan Valley Way.

Cowra is included in the rainfall recorder and weather forecast region for the Central West Slopes and Plains division of the Bureau of Meteorology forecasts.

History

The first European explorer to the area, George William Evans, entered the Lachlan Valley in 1815. He named the area the Oxley Plains after his superior the surveyor-general, John Oxley. In 1817 he deemed the area "rather unfit for settlement". A military depot was established not long after at Soldiers Flat near present-day Billimari. Arthur Ranken and James Sloan, from Bathurst, were amongst the first white settlers on the Lachlan. They moved to the area in 1831.

The township of "Coura Rocks" had its beginnings in 1844.  Around 1847, the township site became known as Cowra, and in 1849, was proclaimed a village.

In the 1850s many gold prospectors passed through headed for gold fields at Lambing Flat (Young) and Grenfell. The first school was established in 1857. The first bridge over the Lachlan River was built in 1870. Gold was discovered at Mount McDonald in the 1880s. The rail head from Sydney reached Cowra in 1886. Local government was granted in 1888. The first mobile telephone exchange was established in 1901. The town water supply was established in 1909, the gasworks in 1912 and town supplied electricity was introduced in 1924. From 1904 to 1966 the Cowra Experiment Farm was im operation, experimenting with wheat and with fallow crops.

Cowra hosts an annual Festival of International Understanding, featuring a parade, a fireworks display, balloons for the kids and events showcasing a particular foreign culture. In 2020 it was cancelled due to the COVID-19 pandemic.

Cowra prisoner of war camp
During World War II, Cowra was the site of a prisoner of war (POW) camp. Most of the detainees were captured Japanese and Italian military personnel. However, in July 1942, Indonesian political prisoners from the Dutch Tanahmerah prison on the Digul river, in West Papua, were transported as "prisoners-of-war" to the Cowra prison camp, at the behest of Netherlands East Indies government in exile (with others who were ill being sent to Liverpool). These Indonesian prisoners arrived in mid 1942 and were released on 7 December 1943, and subsequent to their release, played an important role in the black bans which effectively frustrated the Dutch reimposition of colonial rule in the Indies.)

The Cowra breakout

On 5 August 1944, at least 545 Japanese POWs attempted a mass breakout from the camp. Simultaneously, other Japanese prisoners committed suicide, or were killed by their countrymen, inside the camp.

The actions of the POWs in storming machine gun posts, armed only with improvised weapons, showed what Prime Minister John Curtin described as a "suicidal disregard of life".

During the breakout and subsequent recapture of POWs, four Australian guards and 231 Japanese died, and 108 prisoners were wounded. The dead Japanese were buried in Cowra in the specially created Japanese War Cemetery. This is the only such cemetery in Australia, and also holds some of the dead from the World War II air raids on Darwin.

An Avenue of Honour also commemorates those who died in World War I. There is an annual ceremony to commemorate the breakout, involving local school students, council members, local dignitaries and guest Japanese visitors.

Heritage listings 
Cowra has a number of heritage-listed sites, including:
 Blayney-Harden railway: Lachlan River railway bridge, Cowra
 Blayney-Harden railway: Cowra railway station
 Evans Street: Cowra Prisoner of War Camp Site

Population
According to the 2016 census of Population, there were 10,063 people in Cowra.
 Italian people made up 5% of the population. 
 85.2% of people were born in Australia. The next most common country of birth was England at 1.4%.   
 89.0% of people spoke only English at home. 
 The most common responses for religion were Catholic 29.7%, Anglican 26.0% and No Religion 16.0%.
 Cowra has a higher than average unemployment rate. Presently at 8.2%

Climate
Under the Köppen climate classification, Cowra has a borderline semi-arid (BSk) and humid subtropical (Cfa) climate.

Cowra sits on the border zone between the cool, wet highlands of the Great Dividing Range and the hot, dry plains of Western New South Wales. As a result, Cowra experiences climate characteristics of both regions, with cold sub-zero temperatures, frequent frost and rare snow in winter, and frequent 40+ °C temperatures in summer. Other towns that experience this 'border' climate are Inverell and Mudgee further north, Yass and Adelong further south, Corryong in Victoria and Dalby in Queensland.

Rainfall is mild and distributed fairly evenly all year round, however it slightly peaks in summer with thunderstorms and again in winter with cold fronts. Cowra has 145.8 clear days on an annual basis.

Education
Primary schools
Cowra Public
Mulyan Public School
Holman Place Public School
St Raphael's Catholic School (K–6)

Secondary schools
Cowra High School (7–12)
St Raphael's Catholic School (7–12)

Cowra also has a campus of the Western Institute of TAFE.

Media

Radio stations
Radio stations with transmitters located in or nearby to Cowra include-

AM:
 ABC Local Radio 549 AM
 2LF 1350 AM

FM:
 Hit Network 105.9 FM
 Triple M - Central West 105.1 FM
 Roccy FM 99.5 FM
 ABC Classic FM 102.7 FM
 ABC Radio National 104.3 FM
 FM107.5 107.5 FM
 Triple J (2JJJ) 101.9 FM

Television
Cowra receives five free-to-air television networks and their affiliates which are relayed from Orange, and broadcast from nearby Mt Canobolas:

 ABC - ABC TV, ABC TV Plus, ABC ME and ABC News
 SBS - SBS TV , SBS Viceland, SBS Food, NITV,  SBS World Movies and SBS WorldWatch 
 Prime7 - Prime7, 7Two, 7mate, ishop TV, 7flix and Racing.com
 Southern Cross -  10 HD, 10 Bold, 10 Peach, 10 Shake and Sky News Regional 
 WIN- 9HD, 9Gem, 9Go!, 9Life and Gold
 Local half-hour long news bulletins are broadcast by Prime7 and WIN but Southern Cross shows local news updates instead from its Hobart studios.

Print
The local newspaper is the Cowra Guardian, published by Australian Community Media.

Viticulture

Viticulture is a significant industry in the Cowra area. The first vineyards were planted in the 1970s and were predominantly Chardonnay. Since this time, a range of varieties have had success, including Mourvedre and Tempranillo.

Retail 
Cowra has a wide variety of retailers both large and small, including:

 Coles - supermarket
 Woolworths - supermarket
 Aldi - supermarket
 Bunnings Warehouse - hardware
 The Reject Shop - discount variety store
 Total Tools

Japanese War Cemetery and Garden

The Japanese War Cemetery holding the dead from the Cowra Breakout was tended by members of the Cowra RSL after World War II. The cemetery is on Crown land owned by the New South Wales government under trusteeship of the Commonwealth War Graves Commission. Use of the land was granted to Japan in 1963 on a payment-of-costs basis.

In 1971 the Cowra Tourism Development decided to celebrate this link to Japan, and proposed a Japanese Garden for the town. The Japanese government agreed to support this development as a sign of thanks for the respectful treatment of their war dead; the development also received funding from the Australian government and private entities. The Cowra Japanese Garden and Cultural Centre was designed by Ken Nakajima (1914–2000), a world-renowned designer of Japanese gardens at the time. The first stage was opened in 1979, with a second stage opened in 1986.

The gardens were also designed in the style of the Edo period and are a komatsu ("small pine-tree") or strolling garden. The rocky hillside, manicured hedges, waterfalls and streams, and the two lakes provide a serene environment for a myriad of birdlife. Special features of the Garden include a Bonsho Bell, a traditional Edo Cottage, an authentic open air Tea House and a Bonsai House.  They are designed to show all of the landscape types of Japan. At five hectares (12 acres), the Cowra Japanese Garden is the largest Japanese garden in the Southern Hemisphere. An annual Sakura Matsuri (cherry blossom festival) is an event in Cowra's tourism calendar and is held in the gardens during September. The festival celebrates the birth of spring. It attracts performers from across Australia and around the world.  Locals, Australian and international visitors alike have the opportunity to experience traditional elements of Japanese culture. Sakura at the Cowra Japanese Garden is celebrated annually when the cherry blossoms are at their peak.

Sporting clubs
Cowra Eagles are a rugby union team playing in the Central West Rugby Union competition.
Cowra Magpies are a rugby league team playing in the Group 10 competition.
Cowra Blues are an Australian rules football team playing in the Central West AFL competition.
Cowra Eagles are a soccer club playing in the Orange District Soccer Senior Men's (1st Grade) competition.
Cowra Netball association play in State Age Championships competition.
Cowra Squashed Frogs are a hockey team playing in the Western Division.

References

External links

 
 Cowra Shire Council
 Fact sheet on 1944 Cowra outbreak, National Archives of Australia
 Cowra Tourism Corporation
 Cowra Japanese Garden

Towns in New South Wales
Towns in the Central West (New South Wales)